Cosio di Arroscia (locally ) is a comune (municipality) in the province of Imperia in the Italian region Liguria, located about  southwest of Genoa and about  northwest of Imperia.

History 
In 1957 the Avant-Garde Groupe Situationist International was founded in Cosio di Arroscia by former members of two other avant-garde groupes, the International Movement for an Imaginist Bauhaus (Asger Jorn, Giuseppe Pinot-Gallizio a.o.) and the Lettrist International (Guy Debord a.o.).

Geography 

Cosio di Arroscia borders the following municipalities: Briga Alta, Mendatica, Montegrosso Pian Latte, Ormea, and Pornassio.

References

See also
 Parco naturale regionale delle Alpi Liguri

Cities and towns in Liguria